Chetwynd Airport  is a general aviation airport located adjacent to Chetwynd, British Columbia, Canada.

References

External links

Registered aerodromes in British Columbia
Peace River Regional District